Prime Bangkok Football Club is a Thai football team based in Bangkok and play their home games at the Ramkhamhaeng University Stadium. The club is currently playing in the Thai League 3 Bangkok metropolitan region.

History

Thai football records are hard to come by but recent records do show that Central Lions first came to prominence in the 2007 season playing in the Thailand Division 1 League which was at the 2nd level in the Thai football league system and played under the name Bangkok North Central ASSN. They started the 2007 season in 2007 Group B which featured 12 teams, of which 5 teams would be relegated. Bangkok North Central filled the last relegation spot tied on 29 points with 3 other teams. Goal difference would be the deciding factor in the league and Bangkok North Central would lose out by 1 goal to Nakhon Sawan.

For the 2008 season, Bangkok would start in the Division 2 Group B League which had just been expanded to feature two groups of 11 teams, the top two of which would be promoted. Group B was also a generally pro Bangkok league compared to Group A, therefore many of the sides would be either university or college sides. Bangkok would be a tough team to break down that season and only lost on four occasions, the hard part for them was scoring goals and converting draws into victories.  They duly came 6th, 9 points behind the promotion places.

In 2009, Thai football was once again in a restructuring phase. The 2nd division would be renamed the Regional League Division 2 and Bangkok would start life in the Bangkok Area Division, again a league that generally features university and college sides. One promotion spot would be up for grabs as there would be 5 regional leagues in total. Bangkok would come 3rd, but a long way behind the league winners Raj Pracha. 2009 also saw Bangkok enter the FA Cup for the first time but they were knocked out of the first qualifying round by Thai Summit Samut Prakan who played in the Central/East regional league.

In 2010, it was to be a bad year for Bangkok, they came 12th out of 13 in the Bangkok regional league and also went out of the newly formed Thai League Cup in the first qualifying round. They were relegated from the 2010 Thai Division 2 League Bangkok & field Region league but came back to prominence in the 2012 Thai Division 2 League Bangkok & field Region and were known as Central Lions and played at the Rajamangala University of Technology in Thanyaburi District.

In 2016, this club was taken over by Air Force Central F.C. and this club is the reserve Air Force Central F.C. team.

In 2017, they came back to compete in the 2017 Thailand Amateur League Bangkok Metropolitan Region.

In 2020, this club was taken over and renamed to Prime Bangkok Football Club.

Crest history

Stadium and locations

Seasons

Players

Current squad

Club officials

References

 http://www.smmsport.com/m/news.php?n=171252
 https://web.archive.org/web/20160425122307/http://www.fourfourtwo.com/th/news/thaphfaatidpiik-aerfrchepidtawthiimhwangkhuenaithyliiksngthiimnngbuu-d2
 Air Force Robinson news

External links

Association football clubs established in 2006
Football clubs in Thailand
Sport in Bangkok
2006 establishments in Thailand